Paul D. Hanson (born November 17, 1939) is an American biblical scholar who taught for 40 years at the Harvard Divinity School in Cambridge, Massachusetts.

He spent his whole career at Harvard Divinity School, starting out in 1971 as an Assistant Professor of Old Testament. He was appointed the Florence Corliss Lamont Professor of Divinity (1988–2009) and Bussey Professor of Divinity (1981–1988). Since his retirement from the active faculty in 2009 he has been the Florence Corliss Lamont Research Professor of Divinity.

Education
Hanson received a Bachelor of Arts from Gustavus Adolphus College in 1961 after which he received a Fulbright to study at the University of Heidelberg. In 1965 he received a Bachelor of Divinity from Yale University and in 1970 he completed a Ph.D. at Harvard's Department of Near Eastern Languages and Civilizations.

Career
After receiving his doctoral degree, he spent a year doing archaeological research in Israel, and he has spent sabbatical years in Israel and Germany and most recently at Princeton University. In his courses he focuses on Hebrew prophecy, Jewish literature of the Second Temple Period, the religion of the ancient cultures of Mesopotamia and Egypt, and Biblical Theology.

He is a member of the Old Testament editorial board for the commentary series Hermeneia: A Critical and Historical Commentary on the Bible (published by Fortress Press). As a member of that board, Hanson has acted as the volume editor of the following commentaries: Hosea (by Hans Walter Wolff, 1974), Ezekiel 2 (by Walther Zimmerli, 1983), Micah (by Delbert Hillers, 1984), Jeremiah 1 & 2 (by William L. Holladay, 1986, 1989), and Zephaniah (by Marvin A. Sweeney, 2003).

Hanson is currently working to complete a book examining the interplay between religion and politics, with emphasis on American faith communities rooted in Biblical tradition.

He is a member of University Lutheran Church (Cambridge, MA) and a member of the Council for Lutheran Theological Education in the Northeast.

Select bibliography
Hanson is considered an expert on Biblical hermeneutics and has written numerous books on theological interpretations. His titles include:

 The Dawn of Apocalyptic: The Historical and Sociological Roots of Jewish Apocalyptic Eschatology (1975; rev. ed. 1979)
 Dynamic Transcendence: The Correlation of Confessional Heritage and Contemporary Experience in a Biblical Model of Divine Activity (1978)
 The Diversity of Scripture: A Theological Interpretation (1982)
 (editor) Visionaries and Their Apocalypses (1983)
 The People Called: The Growth of Community in the Bible (1986; 2d ed. 2001)
 Old Testament Apocalyptic (1987)
 Isaiah 40-66 (1995)

References 

1939 births
Gustavus Adolphus College alumni
Living people
Yale Divinity School alumni
Harvard University alumni
Harvard Divinity School faculty